Voděrady may refer to:

 Voděrady (Ústí nad Orlicí District), a village in the Czech Republic
 Voděrady (Blansko District), a village in the Czech Republic
 Voděrady (Rychnov nad Kněžnou District), a village in the Czech Republic

See also 
 Voderady